Germán Barranca Costales (born October 19, 1956 in Veracruz de Ignacio de la Llave, Mexico) is a Mexican former Major League Baseball second baseman. On August 26, 1974 he was purchased by the Kansas City Royals from the Mexico City Reds.  He was listed at 6 feet tall and 160 pounds. German made his major league debut on September 2, 1979 at the age of 22 with the Kansas City Royals vs the New York Yankees.  German played 5 games that year and also played 7 games with the Royals in 1980 with a batting average of .600 in five at bats. On January 21, he was traded by the Kansas City Royals to the Cincinnati Reds for Cesar Geronimo. He played for the Cincinnati Reds in 1981 with a batting average of .333 in six at bats and in 1982 recorded a .255 batting average in 51 at bats. German last game in MLB was on July 11, 1982 vs. the Chicago Cubs at age 25.  German was batting .250 and leading the National League in triples before the All Star break, was sent to Indianapolis, the Triple AAA affiliate of the Cincinnati Reds.   On September 7, 1982, he was sent to the Detroit Tigers by the Cincinnati Reds as part of a conditional deal.  German played 4 years in Major League Baseball  (2 years in the American League played 12 games)  and (2 years in the National League played 55 games) with a total of 67 games, 62 AB,  19 Runs, 18 hits, 2 doubles, 3 triples, 5 stolen bases, a fielding % of .893, and a batting average of .290 

In 1979 playing for the Omaha Royals. German broke the stolen base record in the AAA American Association with 75 bases and was named the most valuable player in the Kansas City Royals Organization.

Barranca, also played for the Naranjeros de Hermosillo in the Pacific Coast Mexican Winter League where he set a record of 6 stolen bases in one game and held for years the most triples in the league's history.

External links

1956 births
Baseball players from Veracruz
Cincinnati Reds players
Indianapolis Indians players
Kansas City Royals players
Living people
Major League Baseball players from Mexico
Major League Baseball second basemen
Mexican expatriate baseball players in the United States
Acereros de Monclova players
Arkansas Travelers players
Evansville Triplets players
Gulf Coast Royals players
Industriales de Monterrey players
Jacksonville Suns players
Oklahoma City 89ers players
Omaha Royals players
Piratas de Campeche players
Rochester Red Wings players
Waterbury Indians players
Waterloo Royals players